Allium kingdonii is a rare species of wild onion endemic to southeastern Tibet. It grows at elevations of 4500–5000 m.

Allium kingdonii generally produces one narrow cylindrical bulb rarely more than 6 mm across. Scape is up to 30 cm tall. Leaves are flat, narrow, shorter than the scape. Umbels have a few reddish-purple flowers.

References

kingdonii
Onions
Flora of Tibet
Plants described in 1960